Colette Cavanagh (born 24 November 1998)  is a Scottish international footballer who currently plays midfield for Rangers in the Scottish Women's Premier League.

Career
Cavanagh started her career at youth level with Rossvale, Then joined Celtic Girls in 2011, She made her first team debut at sixteen before moving to join Spartans in Edinburgh to attend the University of Edinburgh. She returned to Celtic for a season in 2018 before moving to Hibernian, In September 2021 she won the SWPL 1 Player of the Month for September
 becoming the first player to win the award with two different clubs her first award was with Celtic in May 2018. In 2019 she was part of the team that won the Scottish Women's Premier League Cup and in 2022 Cavanagh was included in the first-ever PFA Scotland Women's Team of the Year. In 2022 she joined Rangers.

Honours

Club
Hibernian
 Scottish Women's Premier League Cup: 2019

Rangers
 Scottish Women's Premier League Cup: 2022
 City of Glasgow Woman's Cup: 2022,

References

External links
soccerway profile
SFA Profile

Rangers W.F.C. players
1998 births
Living people
Women's association football midfielders
Scottish women's footballers
Footballers from Glasgow